Carolyn Tucker Halpern is an American developmental psychologist and Professor in the UNC Gillings School of Global Public Health, where she is Chair of the Department of Maternal and Child Health. She is also the deputy director of the National Longitudinal Study of Adolescent Health.

Halpern graduated summa cum laude from the University of Houston in 1976 with a BS in psychology. She then earned a MA (1979) and a PhD (1982) in developmental psychology also from the University of Houston.

References

External links

Faculty page
Curriculum Vitae

Living people
American developmental psychologists
American women psychologists
21st-century American psychologists
University of North Carolina at Chapel Hill faculty
University of Houston alumni
Year of birth missing (living people)
American women academics
21st-century American women